Antonio Casado Ruiz (born 20 March 1961) is a Spanish retired footballer who played as a midfielder.

He spent seven seasons in La Liga, all with Betis.

Club career
Born in Huelva, Andalusia, Casado made his professional debut with Real Betis in 1981, playing five La Liga games in his first season and scoring in a 2–1 away win against RCD Español. In the following four top-flight campaigns he was an important first-team member, never appearing in less than 20 matches and adding three UEFA Cup appearances during his stint with the club.

In the summer of 1987, after featuring rarely for the Verdiblancos in his last two seasons, Casado joined neighbours Recreativo de Huelva of the second division, playing four years with the team and being relegated in his third. He also spent two seasons in that level with Écija Balompié (seven overall), suffering another relegation in 1997.

Casado retired in June 1999 at the age of 38, after a one-year spell with amateurs Dos Hermanas CF.

External links

1961 births
Living people
Footballers from Huelva
Spanish footballers
Association football midfielders
La Liga players
Segunda División players
Segunda División B players
Tercera División players
Betis Deportivo Balompié footballers
Real Betis players
Recreativo de Huelva players
UE Sant Andreu footballers
Écija Balompié players